The 2022 Nonthaburi Challenger was a professional tennis tournament played on hard courts. It was the 1st edition of the tournament which was part of the 2022 ATP Challenger Tour. It took place in Nonthaburi, Thailand from 22 to 28 August 2022.

Singles main-draw entrants

Seeds

 1 Rankings are as of 15 August 2022.

Other entrants
The following players received wildcards into the singles main draw:
  Yuttana Charoenphon
  Kasidit Samrej
  Wishaya Trongcharoenchaikul

The following players received entry from the qualifying draw:
  Gage Brymer
  Hong Seong-chan
  Kyrian Jacquet
  Dayne Kelly
  Yuta Shimizu
  Valentin Vacherot

Champions

Singles

 Valentin Vacherot def.  Lý Hoàng Nam 6–3, 7–6(7–4).

Doubles

 Evgeny Donskoy /  Alibek Kachmazov def.  Nam Ji-sung /  Song Min-kyu 6–3, 1–6, [10–7].

References

2022 in Thai sport
2022 ATP Challenger Tour
August 2022 sports events in Thailand